Far from Home is the eighth and final studio album by the rock band Traffic. It was recorded at a large house called Woodstock, outside Kilcoole to the south of Dublin, and mixed at the Chateau Miraval in Correns, southern France. The project began as a revival of the writing collaboration between Steve Winwood and Jim Capaldi, but soon blossomed into the first Traffic project since 1974.

Recording

The album was recorded in Woodstock, Kilcoole near Dublin, Ireland. Though the subsequent tour would feature a full band, this album features Winwood playing all of the instruments and singing all the vocals, with the exception of Capaldi's drums and backing vocals, Davy Spillane's Uilleann pipes on "Holy Ground", and recording engineer Mick Dolan's rhythm guitar on "Nowhere Is Their Freedom" and programming on the Akai S1000.

The song "State of Grace" was intended to be a Jim Capaldi solo tune, but when the Traffic project took shape, Winwood and Capaldi decided to use it for Far from Home instead.

Release and reception

Far from Home was released on 9 May 1994. The album reached number 29 in the UK Albums Chart, where it remained for four weeks, making it by far Traffic's most commercially successful album in their home country since John Barleycorn Must Die. In Germany, it scored two minor hits ("Here Comes a Man" and "Some Kinda Woman") and reached number 22 in the album charts. It also managed to reach number 33 in the USA Billboard chart.

Singles
"Here Comes a Man" was the first single to be released, peaking at No. 87 in both the UK and Germany. "Some Kinda Woman" was the last single to be released, and peaked at No. 81 in the UK and No. 64 in Germany.

Artwork
The 3D-rendered cover design shows a stick-figure hovering above a checkerboard patterned floor playing a flute. The stick-figure's head is aligned in the middle of the Traffic logo, which is seen in a dark blue-gradient background. The back sleeve for the CD version of the album features a blurry photograph of Winwood and Capaldi on a beach. Several blurry photos of Winwood and Capaldi appear inside the inner sleeve of the booklet.

Track listing

All songs written by Steve Winwood and Jim Capaldi unless otherwise indicated.
 "Riding High" – 5:30
 "Here Comes a Man" – 5:06
 "Far from Home" – 8:33
 "Nowhere is Their Freedom" – 6:57
 "Holy Ground" (Winwood, Capaldi, Davy Spillane) – 7:48
 "Some Kinda Woman" – 5:26
 "Every Night, Every Day" – 5:30
 "This Train Won't Stop" – 5:23
 "State of Grace" – 7:16
 "Mozambique" – 4:22

Personnel 
Traffic
 Steve Winwood – lead and backing vocals, pianos, synthesizers, organ, synthesizer programming, guitars, bass guitar, drum machine programming, flute, timbales (1), saxophone (6), congas (9)
 Jim Capaldi – drums, percussion, backing vocals (4, 6, 7)
Additional musicians 
 Mick Dolan – rhythm guitar (4), Akai S1000 programming
 Davy Spillane – Uilleann pipes (5)

Production 
 Steve Winwood – producer, engineer, mixing 
 Jim Capaldi – assistant producer, art direction 
 Mick Dolan – engineer, mixing 
 Karim Benzezour – mix assistant
 Howard Beck – technician 
 Tim Young – mastering
 Viv Phillips – project coordinator 
 Steve Gardes – design 
 Douglas Brothers – photography 
 Ron Weisner Entertainment – management
 Mixed at Studio Miraval (Le Val, France).
 Mastered at Metropolis Mastering (London, UK).

Release details

 1994 - Virgin CD: 7243 8 39490 2 1 (CDV 2727)
 1994 - Virgin MC: 7243 8 39490 4 5 (TCV 2727)

Chart positions

References

1994 albums
Traffic (band) albums
Virgin Records albums
Albums produced by Steve Winwood